West Carmarthenshire was a parliamentary constituency in Wales which returned one Member of Parliament (MP)  to the House of Commons of the Parliament of the United Kingdom.

It was created for the 1885 general election, when the old two-member Carmarthenshire constituency was divided into two new single-member seats: East Carmarthenshire and West Carmarthenshire, both of which were in turn abolished for the 1918 general election.

Boundaries 
The constituency included the Sessional Divisions of Carmarthen, Llanboidy, Llanfihangel-ar-Arth, Newcastle Emlyn, and St Clears, and parts of the Sessional Divisions of Llandilo and Llandovery. It was an almost exclusively rural and agricultural constituency, with the only significant industry being the tinplate works at Kidwelly in the extreme south of the constituency and the woollen mills around Newcastle Emlyn.

Members of Parliament

History

1885-88
At the first election in 1885, the two sitting members for the former constituency of  Carmarthenshire faced each other. The Conservative candidate, Viscount Emlyn, although most of his family property lay in the eastern part of the county, calculated that his chances there would be negligible  given the growing industrial population which had been a key factor in the triumph of the Liberal candidate, Edward Sartoris at the 1868 general election. He was opposed by the Liberal W.R.H. Powell, himself a former Conservative supporter who had first declared his support for the Liberals at the 1874 election. Powell now proclaimed that he had a duty to the Liberal cause to oppose Emlyn.

It was reported that the Conservatives were confident of their chances in the new West Carmarthenshire constituency, on the grounds that it was largely an agricultural division. However, the electorate had more than doubled in the county, and the 1885 electorate in the Western Division alone exceeded that of the combined county seat in 1880. However, the overwhelmingly nonconformist character of the constituency was regarded as a distinct advantage to the Liberal candidate, and the influence of the chapels predicted to be decisive in view of their direct influence over rural agricultural communities.

After a vigorous contest, Powell won a decisive victory.

By the next election the following year, Emlyn had retired from the fray, and Powell increased his majority significantly.

1889 by-election

Powell died in 1889. After a short campaign he was succeeded by John Lloyd Morgan who comfortably won the by-election.

1890-1910
Morgan was returned unopposed in 1890. In 1895, however, the Conservatives had their best result in the history the constituency, and their candidate, W.J. Buckley of Llanelli, fought a vigorous campaign supported by local landowners. He was still, however, some distance short of victory.

Lloyd Morgan was opposed for the first time for fifteen years at the first General Election of 1910. His opponent, a Welsh-speaking barrister from Manchester, fought a vigorous campaign but made little impression. Later that year it was announced that Morgan was being made a judge and would not contest the second General Election.

The second 1910 general election
Six candidates contested the nomination, including Sir Owen Philipps, who had latterly stood down as member for Pembroke Boroughs, and Courtenay Mansel. The  final choice was between John Hinds, a native of Carmarthen who was now a successful businessman in London and Henry Jones-Davies, who was both a prominent member of Carmarthenshire County Council and brother-in-law of the late Liberal politician, Tom Ellis. Jones-Davies had led throughout the Hinds won the final ballot by 188 votes against 186.

At the election that followed, Hinds was opposed by Jones Cremlyn, who was once again the Conservative candidate. It was suggested at one stage that the Rev Arthur Fuller Mills of Carmarthen, chairman of Carmarthenshire County Council, would contest the seat as an independent but the rumour proved unfounded. Jones Cremlyn fought vigorous campaign, which was enthusiastically supported by the Carmarthen Journal and addressed meetings throughout the constituency, travelling from village to village by motor car.

Following the election, a Carmarthen Journal editorial complained about the dominance of the Liberals in the constituency and the means by which nonconformist ministers sustained them.

Another General Election was required to take place before the end of 1915. The political parties had been making preparations for an election to take place and by the July 1914, Alfred Stephens of Kidwelly had been chosen to oppose John Hinds.

References 

Historic parliamentary constituencies in South Wales
Constituencies of the Parliament of the United Kingdom established in 1885
Constituencies of the Parliament of the United Kingdom disestablished in 1918
West Carmarthenshire